The 1934 Loyola Wolf Pack football team was an American football team that represented Loyola College of New Orleans (now known as Loyola University New Orleans) as a member of the Southern Intercollegiate Athletic Association (SIAA) during the 1934 college football season. In its second season under head coach Robert Erskine, the team compiled a 4–5 record and was outscored by a total of 89 to 81. The team played its home games at Loyola University Stadium in New Orleans.

Schedule

References

Loyola
Loyola Wolf Pack football seasons
Loyola Wolf Pack football